Filer High School is a high school in Filer, Idaho, United States.

References

Public high schools in Idaho
Schools in Twin Falls County, Idaho